Ĉ or ĉ (C circumflex) is a consonant in Esperanto orthography, representing the sound .

It is based on the letter c. Esperanto orthography uses a diacritic for all four of its postalveolar consonants, as do the Latin-based Slavic alphabets. Letters and digraphs that are similar to ĉ and represent the same sound include Slovene č, Albanian ç, Polish digraph cz,  English and Spanish digraph ch, French trigraph tch, German tetragraph tsch, Hungarian digraph cs, Basque and Catalan digraph tx and Italian c before i or e.

Character mappings

See also
 Ĝ
 Ĥ
 Ĵ
 Ŝ
 Ŭ

Esperanto letters with diacritics
Latin letters with diacritics